Xueshan Township (Mandarin: 雪山乡) is a township in Maqên County, Golog Tibetan Autonomous Prefecture, Qinghai, China. In 2010, Xueshan Township had a total population of 1,850 people: 916 males and 934 females: 593 under 14 years old, 1,160 aged between 15 and 64 and 97 over 65 years old.

References 

Township-level divisions of Qinghai
Golog Tibetan Autonomous Prefecture